C-mon & Kypski is a Dutch musical group from Utrecht. The band consists of four members: Thomas Elbers alias  Kypski  discjockey, producer), Simon Akkermans alias  C-Mon  (dj, producer), Daniel Rose ((bass) guitar) and Jori Collignon (keyboardist).

Biography 

C-Mon & Kypski had tours in Europe, North America and South Africa, and released four albums. They first experimented with hip-hop and electronica, and later on a more eclectic sound. C-Mon & Kypski makes genre-crossing music. Esquire magazine (USA) described the band in 2007 as "The hot shit in Europe right now."

For example, the band have used turntables and guitars, synthesizers, odd samples, jazz musicians, rappers and a Klezmer band. They also mix flamenco and dubstep with their music.

On October 23, 2009 the band released the album 'We Are Square'.

C-Mon & Kypski consists of: Simon (C-Mon); producer and co-founder of the band, Thomas (Kypski); co-founder and six times Dutch DMC champion, Jori; keyboard player and winner of the Devils issued annually by the music industry, and Daniel; guitarist and multi-instrumentalist.

In 2010, the band toured the US three times. The most recent was in April 2010. The band played at the SXSW Festival in Austin, and in clubs like Roxy in LA, Fillmore East at Irving Plaza in New York, Popscene in San Francisco and Metro in Chicago.

On Saturday 29 May 2010, C-mon & Kypski stood at the main stage of the 41st edition of Pinkpop.

Discography

Albums
 2002: Vinyl Voodoo, Supertracks
 2004: C-Mon Cereal, Supertracks
 2004: Static Traveller, Supertracks
 2005: Feel1Vibe Mixtape, Supertracks
 2005: Dutch Rare Food, Supertracks
 2006: Where The Wild Things Are, Jammm
 2008: The Complete Jazz Compilation, Jammm
 2008: The Rock Compilation, PIAS
 2009: We Are Square, Jammm

Singles
 2001: "Junkie HC", Dexdexter Records
 2002: "Vinyl Voodoo Ep, Supertracks
 2006: "Bumpy Road"
 2007: "Make My Day" ft. Pete Philly
 2007: Bumpy Road" (re-issue)
 2009: "China"

Hit list

Albums

|- align=center
|align=left|Where the wild things are||2007||25-08-2007||83||1||
|- align=center
|align=left|We are square||2009||31-10-2009||50||2||
|}

Singles

|- align=center
|align=left|Make my day||2007||-|||||| met Pete Philly / #91 in de Single Top 100
|}

References

External links
 C-mon & Kypski op VPRO 3VOOR12
 C-Mon & Kypski, Popencyclopedie

Dutch musical groups